A protected group, protected class (US), or prohibited ground (Canada) is a category by which people qualified for special protection by a law, policy, or similar authority. In Canada and the United States, the term is frequently used in connection with employees and employment and housing. Where illegal discrimination on the basis of protected group status is concerned, a single act of discrimination may be based on more than one protected class. For example, discrimination based on antisemitism may relate to religion, ethnicity, national origin, or any combination of the three; discrimination against a pregnant woman might be based on sex, marital status, or both.

Canada 

"Prohibited grounds of discrimination" in employment and housing are listed in the federal Canadian Human Rights Act as well as the provincial human rights codes.  For examples the federal law lists: race, national or ethnic origin, colour, religion, age, sex, sexual orientation, gender identity or expression, marital status, family status, genetic characteristics, disability, and conviction for an offence for which a pardon has been granted or in respect of which a record suspension has been ordered.

Council of Europe 
Article 14 of the European Convention on Human Rights states that discrimination is prohibited on "any ground" but also lists several examples.  This protection was expanded by Protocol 12 to the European Convention on Human Rights which states that all law must also applied without discrimination, and not just in housing, employment, and other areas covered by the Convention. This was first litigated in 2009 when the court found in Sejdić and Finci v. Bosnia and Herzegovina that constitutional rules around eligibility to run for office also must be non-discriminatory.

United States
US federal law protects individuals from discrimination or harassment based on the following nine protected classes: sex (including sexual orientation and gender identity), race, age, disability, color, creed, national origin, religion, or genetic information (added in 2008). Many state laws also give certain protected groups special protection against harassment and discrimination, as do many employer policies. Although it is not required by federal law, state law and employer policies may also protect employees from harassment or discrimination based on marital status.  The following characteristics are "protected" by United States federal anti-discrimination law:

 Race – Civil Rights Act of 1964
 Religion – Civil Rights Act of 1964
 National origin – Civil Rights Act of 1964
 Age (40 and over) – Age Discrimination in Employment Act of 1967
 Sex – Equal Pay Act of 1963 and Civil Rights Act of 1964
 Sexual orientation and gender identity as of Bostock v. Clayton County – Civil Rights Act of 1964
 Pregnancy – Pregnancy Discrimination Act
 Familial status – Civil Rights Act of 1968 Title VIII:  Prohibits discrimination for having children, with an exception for senior housing.  Also prohibits making a preference for those with children.
 Disability status – Rehabilitation Act of 1973 and Americans with Disabilities Act of 1990
 Veteran status – Vietnam Era Veterans' Readjustment Assistance Act of 1974 and Uniformed Services Employment and Reemployment Rights Act
 Genetic information – Genetic Information Nondiscrimination Act

Individual states can and do create other classes for protection under state law.

Presidents have also issued executive orders which prohibit consideration of particular attributes in employment decisions of the United States government and its contractors. These have included Executive Order 11246 (1965), Executive Order 11478 (1969), Executive Order 13087 (1998), Executive Order 13279 (2003), and Executive Order 13672 (2014).

See also 
 Affirmative action
 Civil Rights Act of 1866
 Equal Employment Opportunity Commission
 Equality Act 2010
 Fair Housing Act
 Office of Fair Housing and Equal Opportunity
 Suspect classification

References 

Discrimination in the United States
United States labor law
Collective rights
Discrimination in Canada
Canadian labour law